Mount Costigan is a  summit in Alberta, Canada.

Description
Mount Costigan is located north of the eastern end of Lake Minnewanka, on the boundary shared by Banff National Park with Ghost River Wilderness Area. Topographic relief is significant as the summit rises nearly 1,500 meters (4,920 feet) above the lake in 4 kilometers (2.5 miles). Mount Costigan was named in 1904 for John Costigan (1835–1916), a Canadian judge and politician who often visited this area. The peak's toponym was officially adopted November 2, 1956, by the Geographical Names Board of Canada.

Geology

Mount Costigan is composed of sedimentary rock laid down during the Precambrian to Jurassic periods. Formed in shallow seas, this sedimentary rock was pushed east and over the top of younger rock during the Laramide orogeny.

Climate

Based on the Köppen climate classification, Mount Costigan is located in a subarctic climate with cold, snowy winters, and mild summers. Winter temperatures can drop below −20 °C with wind chill factors below −30 °C. Precipitation runoff from this mountain drains into tributaries of the Ghost River.

See also
 
 Geography of Alberta

Gallery

References

Costigan
Costigan